Elections to Erewash Borough Council were held on 2 May 1991 as part of nationwide local elections. The election saw the Labour Party gain control of the Council for the first time since 1976.

Overall results

Erewash Borough Council - Results by Ward

Abbotsford

Breadsall and Morley

Breaston

Cotmanhay

Dale Abbey

Derby Road East

Derby Road West

Draycott

Ilkeston Central

Ilkeston North

Ilkeston South

Kirk Hallam North

Kirk Hallam South

Little Eaton

Long Eaton Central

Nottingham Road

Ockbrook and Borrowash

Old Park

Sandiacre North

Sandiacre South

Sawley

Stanley

Victoria

West Hallam

Wilsthorpe

References

1991
1991 English local elections
1990s in Derbyshire